Brian Hills (born August 17, 1959) is a Canadian ice hockey coach and former player currently the associate head coach for the Rochester Institute of Technology men's ice hockey team since 2005.

Playing career
Hills played ice hockey at Bowling Green State University the same time as current RIT head coach Wayne Wilson where they were teammates.  Hills was a two-time All-American and two-time Hobey Baker Memorial Award finalist. He led the Central Collegiate Hockey Association (CCHA) in scoring twice and was the CCHA Player of the Year in 1983. In addition, Hills was a two-time CCHA All-Academic team member, and was a second team CoSIDA/GTE Academic All-American as a senior. Hills left Bowling Green as its all-time leading scorer and is currently second on the list. He scored 116 goals and added 154 assists for 270 points in 156 games. In 1982-83 he set a school single-season record that still stands with 94 points (37-57-94) in 40 games. Hills led the Falcons in scoring during his final three seasons.

After graduating from Bowling Green with a degree in business administration, Hills spent 11 seasons playing professionally in Europe (eight years in Switzerland and three in Germany). He won three gold medals with Team Canada in Europe's Spengler Cup.

Coaching career

Hills spent seven years (1994-2001) as an assistant coach with Bowling Green. During that time he assisted with Team Canada's national team selection committee in 1997 and 1998. He also coached the Chur (Switzerland) Junior Hockey Team in 1986-87. He would later become the head coach at SUNY Geneseo, a position he would hold for four seasons where he led the Knights to a record of 18-7-4, a SUNYAC Championship, the quarterfinals of the NCAA Division III Tournament, and a No. 7 ranking in the final Division III poll during his last season. Hills amassed a record of 53-42-14 while reviving the Geneseo hockey program. His record during his final two seasons at Geneseo was 32-14-9.

Personal life

Hills lives in Honeoye Falls with his wife, Andrea. They have two children, a daughter Alexandra, and son Trevor. Alexandra was a forward on the RIT women's hockey team that won the 2012 NCAA Division III National Championship. She also earned her bachelor's degree from the university. Trevor will begin his junior season on the hockey team at SUNY Geneseo in 2015-16.

Awards and honours

References

External links

1959 births
Living people
Bowling Green Falcons men's ice hockey players
Canadian ice hockey coaches
Canadian ice hockey forwards
ECH Chur players
Kassel Huskies players
RIT Tigers men's ice hockey coaches
SC Herisau players
SC Rapperswil-Jona Lakers players
AHCA Division I men's ice hockey All-Americans